Margarita de Mayo Izarra (20 July 1889 – 1969) was a Spanish writer, teacher, and journalist.

Professional career
Margarita de Mayo, after obtaining the title of teacher of Primary Higher Education, taught at a graduate school for girls in Valdepeñas from 1914 to 1918.

In 1921, she began to study, thanks to scholarships granted to her, in Great Britain, where she obtained a place at King's College for Women in London.

In 1924, Mayo was named a pensioner of the JAE to attend Vassar College in New York, where she ended up being a permanent member of the Spanish Department until she retired in 1956. She also worked for a time as an instructor at the University of Illinois.

Of her work, her journalistic side is the best known. She sometimes signed her articles as M. de Mayo Izarra, and in them she tried to familiarize Spanish readers with American cities such as New York and the American way of life.

Works
 Lluvia de Hijos: farsa cómica en tres actos (1915)
 Nuestros prosistas y poetas, Burgos
 Galdós (selección de textos por Margarita de Mayo), 1922
 Tradiciones y leyendas de Toledo, Burgos
  "Planes de trabajo" para la JAE, París, 1925
 Obras de Benito Pérez Galdós (edición literaria a cargo de Margarita de Mayo), 1935

References

1889 births
1969 deaths
Alumni of Queen Elizabeth College
People from the Province of Toledo
Spanish expatriates in the United States
Spanish schoolteachers
Spanish women journalists
University of Illinois faculty
Vassar College faculty
20th-century Spanish journalists
20th-century Spanish women